Sadaung is a village in Shwebo District in south-western Sagaing Region in Burma (Myanmar).  It lies in the drainage of the Irrawaddy River.  It is located about halfway between the villages of Yonbingon and Ywathit, 7 km due west of Ywatha.

Notes

External links
 "Sadaung Map — Satellite Images of Sadaung" Maplandia

Populated places in Sagaing Region